James Swanson Sutherland (August 20, 1914 – June 21, 1980) was an American football player and coach.   the head coach at Washington State University in Pullman from 1956 to 1963, with a  record in eight seasons. An innovator, Sutherland ran a prototypical run-and-shoot offense at WSU in the 

Born in Winnipeg, Manitoba, Sutherland moved from Canada to southern California at age nine and graduated from Inglewood High School in 1933.

After graduating from USC in 1937, Sutherland stayed in the Los Angeles area and became a football and track coach at Santa Monica High School. He was its head football coach from 1941 to 1952, with the exception of three years that he served in the  during  his record at SMHS 

Sutherland became a college assistant in 1953 at the University of California in Berkeley under Pappy Waldorf for two years, then moved to the University of Washington in Seattle in 1955 under head coach 

In his final season at WSU in 1963, Sutherland's salary was $17,500, near the top for West Coast coaches. After a  he voluntarily stepped down in December with a year remaining on his contract, and then owned several automobile dealerships in Spokane.

Following an extended illness, Sutherland died in 1980 at age 65 at his home in Hayden Lake, Idaho, and was buried in Coeur d'Alene.

Head coaching record

References

External links
 

1914 births
1980 deaths
American football halfbacks
California Golden Bears football coaches
USC Trojans football players
Washington Huskies football coaches
Washington State Cougars football coaches
High school football coaches in California
Inglewood High School (California) alumni
Sportspeople from Winnipeg
Coaches of American football from California
Players of American football from Inglewood, California
Players of American football from Santa Monica, California
Canadian emigrants to the United States
United States Navy personnel of World War II
Gridiron football people from Manitoba